Vavar, known reverently as Vavarswami, is a legendary figure from Kerala. He is the celebrated Muslim acquaintance of Hindu deity Ayappan. There is a shrine dedicated to Vavaraswami at Sabarimala, as well as Vavaraswami's mosque at Erumely opposite to an Ayyappan temple. This shows the religious and cultural harmony practised by Hindus in India.

Legend
There are many legends about Vavar and his association with Ayyappa.Vavar belong to Pandya Desam near Madurai and whose family migrated to travancore. the family encountered Ayyappan and the friendship began, he was defeated. Impressed by the youth's valour, Vavar became messenger of Lord Ayyappa and helped him in the wars in the mountainous region. As time passed, Vavar too became an ardent devotee of Ayyappa just like Kaduthaswami and came to be known as Vavar swami. The old sword on the wall of the Vavar shrine symbolises the eminence of Vavar as a great warrior. It is believed that the Lord Ayyappa himself instructed the King of Pandala Desam to build a mosque for Vavar at Erumely in Kottayam District. Sabarimala shrine is about 50 km away, deep in the Forest in Pathanamthitta district

Erumely is the gateway to Sabarimala, the hillock shrine of Lord Ayyappa. This place is very famous for 'Pettathullal', a kind of mass spiritual dance perform by Ayyappa devotees. Pettathullal is performed in the Makaravilaku season, i.e., from mid December to mid January every year to commemorate the annihilation of a 'Mahishi' by Lord Ayyappa.

It is believed that the aim of the incarnation of Lord Dharmasasta as son of Shiva and Vishnu was the annihilation of the Rakshasi Mahishi. Since Ayyappa is considered as a human incarnation of Dharmasasta, Erumely is an important place of worship for Ayyappa devotees. 

After killing the Mahishi at Erumely, Dharmasastha performed a dance on her dead body. In order to commemorate this event, the devotees perform the ritual called pettathullal in Erumely.

The barefooted devotees perform this dance by wearing black dhotis, and garnishing their body with different colour powders and flowers and carrying toy bows, arrows and shrub branches and chanting the slogan "Ayyappa-thin-thakathom, Swami-thin-thakathom"

The place name Erumely is believed to have been derived from the word 'Eruma kolli' fence formed with the help of buffaloes, which later was transformed to Erumely.

En route the pilgrimage to Sabarimala during the makaravilakku season almost all of the Ayyappa devotees will come to Erumely and perform the ritual. Pettathullal starts from the small temple situated at the heart of Erumely town known as 'Kochambalam'. From there the dance procession advance to the Muslim mosque called 'Vavar palli' opposite to Kochambalam and the devotees worship 'Vavarswamy'.

Finally the procession ends up at Dharmasastha temple known as 'Valliyambalam'.

Shrine

There is a shrine dedicated to Vavar in Sabarimala next to the main temple. As per Islamic teachings there is no idol, but just a carved stone slab symbolises the deity of Vavar. A green coloured silk cloth is hung across one of the three walls. The fourth side is open. An old sword is also kept near the wall. The main offering to Vavar is black pepper. A Muslim priest still performs the rituals today as he was a Muslim.

See also
Ayyanar
Sabarimala
Maalikapurathamma

References

Indian Muslims